Pasta is a generic term for foods made from an unleavened dough of flour and water, and sometimes a combination of egg and flour.

Pasta may also refer to:

People

First name
Pasta Dioguardi, an Argentine film and TV actor
Pasta Khan, a captive held at the Bagram Theater Internment Facility

Last name
Giuditta Pasta, 19th century opera singer
John Pasta, a computer scientist

Nickname
David Pastrňák (born 1996), Czech ice hockey player

Arts, entertainment, and media
Pasta (TV Series), a 2010 South Korean drama series
Pasta ZZ, a Serbian new wave band

Other uses
Arrival theorem (known as the PASTA property), the mathematics of some stochastic processes (e.g., Poisson Arrivals see Time Averages)
PASTA domain, a region of certain penicillin binding proteins
Pasta filata, a technique in the manufacture of a family of Italian cheeses 
Nuclear pasta, forms of matter hypothesized to exist in the crust of neutron stars
S.S. Felice Scandone, an Italian basketball club known from 1996-97 as Pasta Baronia Avellino